Rhona is a Scottish television sitcom starring Rhona Cameron. It was the first British LGBT sitcom. The show was critically panned.

Cast
 Rhona Cameron as Rhona
 Mel Giedroyc as Lisa
 Dave Lamb as Geoff
 Janet Brown as Mother
 Vicki Pepperdine as Ally

Episode listing

References

2000 British television series debuts
2000 British television series endings
2000s British sitcoms
2000s British LGBT-related comedy television series
Television shows set in London